Christos Zalokostas (1894–1975) was a Greek industrialist, fencer and sport shooter. He competed at the 1936 Summer Olympics.

Biography
Zalokostas was an Aromanian. He also engaged in writing. Christos married Roxane Manos, daughter of Colonel Petros Manos, sister of Princess Aspasia of Greece and Denmark and aunt of Queen Alexandra of Yugoslavia.

References

External links
 

1894 births
1975 deaths
Greek male fencers
Greek male sport shooters
Olympic fencers of Greece
Olympic shooters of Greece
Fencers at the 1936 Summer Olympics
Shooters at the 1936 Summer Olympics
Greek writers
Greek people of Aromanian descent
Aromanian sportspeople
Aromanian writers
Sportspeople from Athens